In philosophy, Wittgenstein's ladder is a metaphor set out by Ludwig Wittgenstein about learning. In what may be a deliberate reference to Søren Kierkegaard's Concluding Unscientific Postscript to Philosophical Fragments, the penultimate proposition of the Tractatus Logico-Philosophicus (translated from the original German) reads:

Given the preceding problematic at work in his Tractatus, this passage suggests that, if a reader understands Wittgenstein's aims in the text, then those propositions the reader would have just read would be recognized as nonsense. From Propositions 6.4–6.54, the Tractatus shifts its focus from primarily logical considerations to what may be considered more traditionally philosophical topics (God, ethics, meta-ethics, death, the will) and, less traditionally along with these, the mystical. The philosophy presented in the Tractatus attempts to demonstrate just what the limits of language are—and what it is to run up against them. Among what can be said for Wittgenstein are the propositions of natural science, and to the nonsensical, or unsayable, those subjects associated with philosophy traditionally—ethics and metaphysics, for instance.

Curiously, the penultimate proposition of the Tractatus, proposition 6.54, states that once one understands the propositions of the Tractatus, one will recognize that they are nonsensical (unsinnig), and that they must be thrown away. Proposition 6.54, then, presents a difficult interpretative problem. If the so-called picture theory of language is correct, and it is impossible to represent logical form, then the theory, by trying to say something about how language and the world must be for there to be meaning, is self-undermining. This is to say that the picture theory of language itself requires that something be said about the logical form sentences must share with reality for meaning to be possible. This requires doing precisely what the picture theory of language precludes. It would appear, then, that the metaphysics and the philosophy of language endorsed by the Tractatus give rise to a paradox: for the Tractatus to be true, it will necessarily have to be nonsense by self-application; but for this self-application to render the propositions of the Tractatus nonsense (in the Tractarian sense), then the Tractatus must be true.

Other philosophers before Wittgenstein, including Zhuang Zhou, Schopenhauer and Fritz Mauthner, had used a similar metaphor.

In his notes of 1930 Wittgenstein returns to the image of a ladder  with a different perspective:

See also

References 

Ludwig Wittgenstein
Philosophical analogies
Philosophy of education
Analytic philosophy
Ladders